The Italian partisan brigades were armed formations involved in the Italian resistance during the World War II.

They were formed on voluntary base by irregular soldiers and sometimes were organized by former army members who served in the Italian occupied territories. Those formations had been active between the 8 September 1943 (with the Badoglio Proclamation) and the end of the war on 6 May 1945.

History 
During the WWII, groups of partisans were formed after the Badoglio Proclamation by former members of the Royal Italian Army located in the north centre of Italy and in the territories occupied by the Kingdom like those of the Balkans. The former soldiers were then flanked by anti-fascists, exiles and expatriates.
 
In the autumn of 1943, the Direction of the Italian Communist Party suggested the formation of organized structures and promoted the creation of the Garibaldi battalions. These groups were conceived as assault brigades because they had to be immediately active but the organization would be formed during their activity.

Components 
During the war, new formations were continuously created until April 1945, and an important event was the creation of the General Command of Corpo Volontari della Libertà (CVL, "Corps of Freedom Volunteers") on 9 June 1944 in Milan, where the headquarters of main partisan organizations were located. The CVL represented the partisan movement among Allies and the Italian government and it had the purpose of coordinate brigades and local National Liberation Committees.

According to the communist members, the brigade formation implied a military-like model of organization with a hierarchy formed by General Command, divisions, brigades, battalions, companies, squads and groups. It was also introduced the charge of the "political commissar" according to the experiences of the October Revolution and the International Brigades during the Spanish Civil War. This kind of organization would be realized only in summer 1944, when also the other parties adopted the military-political structure, with or without "commissars" representing the party of reference.

Brigades of army-men were formed mainly abroad by former soldiers and officers who did not accepted to be humiliated and imprisoned by the Nazis. After the Armistice of Cassibile, Allies allowed the Kingdom to reorganize the remaining army forces which were initially left without any order but most soldiers decided to join the resistance brigades already active.

According to the newspaper Avvenire, catholic formations were often in contrast with the other ones of different political sides, but during the liberation war there was still a collaboration from both the sides. Catholics who actively took part to the Resistance were 65,000 - 80,000 out of about 200,000 partisans.

During the Resistance various formations merged and subdivided according to the situations of the operative areas, with different criteria and sizes. For example, some Garibaldi groups had a pyramidal structure:

 The Squad (Squadra), which was the lowest unit which was formed by 10-20 combatants
 Three Squads formed a Company (Compagnia) or Detachment (Distaccamento), with 30-60 combatants
 Three Companies or Detachment formed a Battalion (Battaglione) of 90-180 combatants
 Three Battalions formed a Brigade (Brigata) of 270-540 combatants
 Three Brigades formed a Division (Divisione) of 810-1620 combatants

Political affiliations 
Within the Corpo volontari della libertà there were the following political affiliations:

 Brigate Garibaldi, GAP and SAP were related to the Italian Communist Party (PCI)
 Brigate Giustizia e Libertà, led by Ferruccio Parri, were related to the Action Party (PdA)
 Brigate Matteotti were related to the Italian Socialist Party of Proletarian Unity (the name of the Italian Socialist Party at the time) led by Sandro Pertini and Giuseppe Saragat.
 Brigate del popolo, Brigate Fiamme Verdi and Brigate Osoppo were related to the Christian Democracy (DC) and the catholic religion in general.
 Brigate Mazzini were related to the Italian Republican Party (PRI).
 The formations called badogliane (also known as azzurre or autonome) were mainly formed by those with liberal or conservative ideals, united by their loyalty towards the Monarchy. Born among the divisions of the Royal Army, they were affiliated with the House of Savoy and recognized Raffaele Cadorna as their military leader. The azzurre formations maintained their hierarchical structure and they could give to the Resistance their war expertise and relations with the Allied Forces, essential for supplies and aids.
 Organizzazione Franchi of Edgardo Sogno represented the Italian Liberal Party and the monarchicals.
 There were also Trotskyist organizations, like the Movimento Comunista d'Italia, and anarchic formations like Brigate Bruzzi Malatesta of Milan.

Sometimes names were not closely linked to the relative parties: for example, the Osoppo Brigades of Friuli, which were born with an important contributions of PdA, accepted their dependence on DC and the Friulian clergy. The Brigate Fiamme Verdi diversified themselves in the territory: the Lombard ones, formed by catholic intellectuals, became exclusive military formations with a liberal orientation; the ones of Reggio Emilia, instead, were directly led by DC as the Brigate del Popolo. The Mazzini Brigades in Veneto did not have a close relationship with PRI as the Lombard ones.

Partisan mountain formations in April 1945

In Italy 
The following is a list of Division and Brigade Commands of partisan formations which operated in the mountains of centre-north Italy in April 1945, classified by partisan and historian Roberto Battaglia.

There were:

 46 Garibaldi formations
 33 GL (Giustizia e Libertà)
 12 Matteotti
 4 Fiamme Verdi
 15 autonomous formations

Other partisan formations 
The following are the Divisional and Brigade commands of partisan formations which operated during the Resistance and had not been classified by Battaglia.

Notes about other formations 
The Brigate Osoppo were coordinated for a period of 1944 by unified military command of division together with the Brigate Garibaldi while having the organizational autonomy. An example of this was during the government of the partisan Free Republic of Carnia.

Partisan formations abroad 
Partisan formations abroad were significant and were formed by militars of former divisions of the Royal Italian Army located outside the current national borders at 8 September 1943, in the Balkans. Soldiers decided voluntarily to reorganize themselves in order to avoid the imprisonment by Nazis and to collaborate with local groups. Among the formations, there were:

See also 

National Liberation Committee
 Italian Resistance Movement
ANPI

References

Bibliography

External links 
 
 

Anti-fascist organisations in Italy
Italian resistance movement